The following page lists power stations that run on natural gas, a non-renewable resource. 
Other power stations may be found in national lists linked from the end of this article.

In service

See also 

 List of largest power stations in the world
 List of coal power stations
 List of fuel oil power stations
 List of nuclear power stations

References

External links